The 2009 WAFL season was the 125th season of the West Australian Football League in its various incarnations. It saw South Fremantle break Subiaco’s dynasty that had seen the Lions a kick shy of a perfect season in 2008, winning their last ten games after the early part of the season was the most evenly contested since the nine-club competition began in 1997.

In the end, however, the top four was the same as in 2008. Peel Thunder, with Dean Buszan back, at one point looked like they might achieve their first season with more wins than losses, but returned to their old ways, losing their last ten games by an average of sixty-two points, whilst East Fremantle did not build upon their excellent finish to 2008. 2008 wooden spooners East Perth turned out the biggest threat to the top four with seven wins from eight matches but failed in their last match against Subiaco.

Home-and-away season

Round 1

Round 2

Round 3

Round 4 (Easter weekend)

Round 5

Round 6 (Anzac Day weekend)

Round 7

Round 8

Round 9

Round 10 (Foundation Day)

Round 11

Round 12

Round 13

Round 14

Round 15

Round 16

Round 17

Round 18

Round 19

Round 20

Round 21

Round 22

Round 23

Ladder

Finals

First semi-final

Second semi-final

Preliminary final

Grand Final

References

External links
Official WAFL website
West Australian Football League Season 2009

West Australian Football League seasons
WAFL